Gateway Tower or Gateway Towers may refer to the following

Gateway Towers, a residential building in Pittsburgh
Gateway Tower (Cubao), an office building in the Quezon City, Philippines
Gateway Towers Mumbai, a residential complex in India
Gateway Tower (Chicago), a conceptual proposal for a mixed-use skyscraper in Chicago
Gateway Mall (Araneta Center), a mall sometimes referred to as Gateway Tower Mall

See also
The Gateway (Singapore), adjacent buildings in Singapore